Irene Scharrer (2 February 188811 January 1971) was an English classical pianist.

Early life and education 
Irene Scharrer was born in London, the daughter of Herbert Tobias Scharrer and Ida Henrietta Samuel Scharrer. She studied at the Royal Academy of Music with Tobias Matthay. Scharrer is sometimes erroneously described as pianist Myra Hess's cousin. She was distantly related to another woman pianist, Harriet Cohen, the two sharing a great-great-grandfather.

Career 
Scharrer made her London début at the age of 16, and gave concerts regularly until June 1958, where she appeared for the last time, playing Mozart's Sonata for Two Pianos with Myra Hess. They often performed four-handed compositions together. "Her playing is virile, yet withal delicate and poetic," explained a 1912 reviewer, "a lovely touch and poetic style combined with warmth of tone, but pervading all delicacy and refinement." She was especially known for playing the works of Chopin. 

Other collaborators included Arthur Nikisch in Berlin, Hungarian violinist Louis Pecskai, and Landon Ronald in London. She visited Sir Edward Elgar in 1918 and was promised the first performance of his piano concerto, then being sketched. Scharrer gave her first American concerts in 1926, in Boston and New York. She gave a radio concert in 1929.

Recordings
A selection of reissues is commercially available.

From as early as 1909 she recorded for HMV, then between 1929 and the mid-1930s for Columbia.  Recorded repertoire included:
 
Bach Prelude and Fugue (HMVD576)
Chopin Prelude in F-sharp minor; Waltz in E minor (HMV E255); Fantaisie-Impromptu; Impromptu in A-flat (HMV D1087); Study in G-flat (HMV D1303); Study in F minor Op. 25 No. 2
Saint-Saëns Allegro Scherzando from Piano Concerto in G (HMV D81)
Schumann Intermezzo in E-flat (HMV D87)
Mendelssohn Rondo Capricioso (HMV D87); The Bees' Wedding (HMV D1303)
Sinding Rustle of Spring (HMV D1087)
Debussy Poissons d'or; Reflets dans l'eau (HMV D914); Arabesque No. 2 (HMV D576)

Personal life 
Scharrer married Samuel Gurney Lubbock, who was a housemaster at Eton College. They had two children, Ian and Rachel. She died January 11, 1971, at the age of 82.

References

1888 births
1971 deaths
English classical pianists
English women pianists
Classical piano duos
Alumni of the Royal Academy of Music
Pupils of Tobias Matthay
Jewish classical pianists
20th-century English women musicians
20th-century classical pianists
Women classical pianists
20th-century women pianists